The 2019 Diamond Head Classic was a mid-season eight-team college basketball tournament that was played on December 22, 23, and 25 at the Stan Sheriff Center in Honolulu, Hawaii. It was the eleventh annual Diamond Head Classic tournament, and was part of the 2019–20 NCAA Division I men's basketball season.

Campus site games

Bracket

Tournament games

Quarterfinals

5th–8th place playoffs

7th place game

5th place game

Semifinals

3rd place game

Championship

References

Diamond Head Classic
Diamond Head Classic
Diamond Head Classic